Cirilo "Tommy" Cruz Dilan (born February 15, 1951) is a former outfielder in Major League Baseball who played for the St. Louis Cardinals and Chicago White Sox. Cruz batted and threw left-handed. He is the brother of Héctor and José Cruz, and uncle of José Cruz Jr.

Career
Cruz had a brief major league career, appearing in seven games for the Cardinals and White Sox, going hitless in two at-bats with two runs scored. He also played in the Rangers and Yankees farm systems. He was traded along with cash from the Cardinals to the Rangers for Sonny Siebert on October 26, 1973. He was dealt along with Jim Spencer from the White Sox to the Yankees for Stan Thomas and cash on December 12, 1977. The transaction also included an exchange of minor-league right‐handed pitcher with Ed Ricks going to the White Sox and Bob Polinsky to the Yankees.

From  through , Cruz played in Japan for the Nippon-Ham Fighters.

On January 14, Cruz was named the hitting coach for the Single-A High Desert Mavericks in the Seattle Mariners organization.

Acting
Cruz participated as an actor in the Puerto Rican film, Los Diaz de Doris, playing a policeman.

See also
 List of Major League Baseball players from Puerto Rico
 List of Puerto Ricans

References

External links

Japanese Baseball Daily

1951 births
Living people
Arkansas Travelers players
Baseball coaches
Chicago White Sox players
Columbus Clippers players
Puerto Rican expatriate baseball people in Taiwan
Gulf Coast Cardinals players
Iowa Oaks players
Lewiston Broncs players
Major League Baseball left fielders
Major League Baseball players from Puerto Rico
Nippon Ham Fighters players
Nippon Professional Baseball designated hitters
People from Arroyo, Puerto Rico
Pittsfield Rangers players
Puerto Rican expatriate baseball players in Japan
Sacramento Solons players
Spokane Indians players
St. Louis Cardinals players
St. Petersburg Cardinals players
Tacoma Yankees players
Tulsa Oilers (baseball) players
Fubon Guardians coaches
Rakuten Monkeys coaches
CTBC Brothers coaches